Rollin Kirby (September 4, 1875 in Galva, Illinois – May 8, 1952 in New York, New York) was an American political cartoonist.  In 1922 he was chronologically the first winner of the Pulitzer Prize for Editorial Cartooning, an honor that he would receive three times.

Kirby worked as a cartoonist at the New York Mail, New York World and the New York Post. His Pulitzer Prizes were for cartoons "On the Road to Moscow" (1921), "News from the Outside World" (1924), and "Tammany" (1928).

Select works

References
 Webster's Biographical Dictionary, G. & C. Merriam Co., 1980.

External links

Rollin Kirby posters, hosted by the University of North Texas Libraries Digital Collections

1875 births
1952 deaths
People from Hastings, Nebraska
American editorial cartoonists
Pulitzer Prize for Editorial Cartooning winners
People from Galva, Illinois